Laura Ford (born 1961) in Cardiff, Wales is a British sculptor.

Early life 
Growing up in a travelling fairground family, Ford was educated at Stonar School in Wiltshire, and then at Bath Academy of Art from 1978 to 1982, while spending a term at the Cooper Union School of Art in New York City. In 1982 she was invited to take part in the annual New Contemporaries exhibition at the Institute of Contemporary Arts and then studied at the Chelsea School of Art from 1982 to 1983.

Work 
Ford has lived and worked in London since 1982 and has been identified with the New British Sculpture movement since her participation in the 1983 survey exhibition The Sculpture Show at the Serpentine Gallery and The Hayward, as well as participating in the British Art Show 5 in 2000.

Marcello Spinelli wrote (British Art Show 5) "Ford’s creatures are faithful representations of fantasy and, at times, a nightmarish imagination.  With their bitter-sweet, menacing and endearing qualities, her stuffed animals and dolls appeal to childhood memories and inhabit a world we immediately recognize as somewhat familiar."  

Her work is represented in many public collections including; the Tate Gallery,  the Victoria and Albert Museum, the Government Art Collection, Potteries Museum, National Museums and Gallery of Wales; Museum of Modern Art, University of Iowa; the Arts Council of Great Britain; the Contemporary Art Society; Unilever; Penguin Books;  Oldham Art Gallery, The New Art Gallery Walsall, The Glynn Vivian Art Gallery, The Meijier Gardens, Grand Rapids USA, and The Gateway Foundation, St. Louis.

She has exhibited widely including; Solo, "2012 Days of Judgment", Kulturzentrum Englische Kirche und Galerie Scheffel, Bad Homburg, and The New Art Centre, Roche Court, UK, 2011 Frederik Meijer Gardens & Sculpture Park, Grand Rapids, MI, USA, 2007, "Rag and Bone", Turner Contemporary,  Margate, 2006 "Armour Boys", Royal Scottish Academy, Edinburgh, 2004, "Wreckers", Beaconsfield, London, 2003, Ford "Headthinkers", Houldsworth Gallery, Cork Street. 2002, "The Great Indoors", Salamanca Centre of Contemporary Art, Spain, 1998, Camden Arts Centre, London (with Jacqui Poncelet) Group 2011 with Magdalena Abakanowicz, at the Industriemuseum Westfälisches Landesmuseum, Bocholt, Germany, 2005, Venice Biennale for Wales, 2004 "Into My World: Recent British Sculpture", Aldrich Museum of Contemporary Art in Connecticut, USA, with Matt Franks, Roger Hiorns, James Ireland, Jim Lambie, and Mike Nelson.

Academic career 

Between 1983 and 1995 Ford was a lecturer at Chelsea School of Art, Senior Lecturer at Middlesex University, also teaching extensively at most London art schools.

Public commissions 
 2014 	        Southmeads Hospital Bristol,
 2012      	University Hospital Heidelberg Germany,
 2009 	        City Stockholm, Sweden,
 2007		'Look Ahead', Short Term Housing Project,
 2006		‘Weeping Girls’ Jupiter Artland,
 2002      	Swiss Cottage Children’s Library, London,
 2001-02	Swiss Cottage Children’s Library, London
 1998		British High Commission, Ottawa
 1997		Surrey Docks/Dockland Development Agency
 1993		'Chiltern Sculpture Trail', Oxford
 1989-90	West Bromwich Town Centre, WBC/PADT

Gallery

Personal life 
Ford lives and works in Camden alongside her husband, the sculptor Andrew Sabin, and their three children.

Notes and reference

External links 

 Grizedale Sculpture Laura Ford
 Laura Ford - Große Einzelausstellung in der Villa Wessel in Iserlohn 17. April 2015 - 21. Juni 2015

1961 births
Living people
20th-century British sculptors
21st-century British sculptors
20th-century Welsh women artists
21st-century Welsh women artists
Alumni of Bath School of Art and Design
Alumni of Chelsea College of Arts
Artists from Cardiff
Welsh contemporary artists
Welsh women sculptors